Eduruleni Manishi is a 1975 Telugu-language action film, produced by C. Ashwini Dutt under the Vyjayanthi Movies banner and directed by K. Bapayya. It stars N. T. Rama Rao and Vanisri , with music composed by K. V. Mahadevan. This film is the debut of Aswini Dutt's Vyjayanthi Movies banner in the film industry. It is a remake of the Hindi film Johny Mera Naam (1970). The film's title was later used as the title of Rama Rao's memoir, by his wife Lakshmi Parvathi.

Plot 
The film begins on Shekar (N. T. Rama Rao) a valiant and intimidation to gangsters. In his childhood, his father (Satyanarayana) is brutally killed by two dreadful monsters Ranga (Prabhakar Reddy) & Sarkar (Kanta Rao). At that moment, Shekar notices their symbol and absconds with his younger brother Gopi when the wheel of fortune makes them separated. At present, Shekar is in search of them, so, he confronts the racketeers for the symbol and counterspy police without revealing his identity. Parallelly Gopi (Jaggayya) becomes an honest police officer and the govt specially appoints him as a check on these hoods. Meanwhile, Shekar gets acquainted with a beautiful girl Latha (Vanisri) a gangbanger, so, Shekar follows her like white on rice and Gopi shadows both. Slowly, Shekar & Latha fall in love when he learns that she is ensnared by a crime syndicate headed by two malicious Ranga & Sarkar one that feigns as an honourable. Here, Shekar ensures to safeguard Latha, so, he too affiliates the gang and works as a double agent to Gopi. Once in a bust, Ranga's son Vasu (Jaya Bhaskar) is caught. At the same time, Ranga & Sarkar discovers that Shekar has avenged against the homicides of his father i.e. themselves and also regarding his younger brother. Thereupon, Ranga forges Vasu as his younger brother and makes Shekar free Vasu. Howbeit, Gopi chases them when Shekar realises him as his original brother and also identifies Ranga as the hit person of his father. At last, Shekar, with the help of Gopi & Latha ceases Ranga & Sarkar. Finally, the movie ends on a happy note with the marriage of Shekar & Latha.

Cast 
N. T. Rama Rao as Raja Shekar
Vanisri as Latha
Jaggayya as Inspector Gopi
Satyanarayana as Shekar's father
Kanta Rao as Sarkar
Prabhakar Reddy  as Ranga Rao/ Jaggu
Raja Babu as Bachi
Allu Ramalingaiah as Bhadraiah
Jaya Bhaskar as Vasu
Padmapriya as Sarala
Hemalatha as Latha's mother
Nirmalamma as Bhadraiah's wife

Production 
Eduruleni Manishi is the first film produced by Ashwini Dutt under the banner Vyjayanthi Movies.

Soundtrack 
Music composed by K. V. Mahadevan. Lyrics were written by Acharya Aatreya.

References

External links 
 

1970s spy thriller films
1970s Telugu-language films
Films directed by K. Bapayya
Films scored by K. V. Mahadevan
Indian spy thriller films
Telugu remakes of Hindi films